Aphroditi Sports Hall is the largest arena in the city of Paphos. It is named after "Aphrodite", also known as Venus, one of the 12 ancient Greek gods which is said was born at Petra Tou Romiou 20 km East. This arena can host up to 2,000 spectators. Is the home of "Pafiakos" and "Dionysos" volleyball clubs, both playing at the Cypriot first division.

Athletics (track and field) venues in Cyprus
Sports venues in Cyprus
Indoor arenas in Cyprus
Volleyball venues in Cyprus
Buildings and structures in Paphos